Soda lake is a lake in Grant County, Washington, United States.

References 

Reservoirs in Washington (state)
Lakes of Grant County, Washington